Gmina Jasienica is a rural gmina (administrative district) in Bielsko County, Silesian Voivodeship, in southern Poland, in the historical region of Cieszyn Silesia. Its seat is the village of Jasienica.

Villages

Neighbouring gminas
Gmina Jasienica is bordered by the gminas of Bielsko-Biała, Brenna, Chybie, Czechowice-Dziedzice, Jaworze and Skoczów.

Twin towns – sister cities

Gmina Jasienica is twinned with:
 Petřvald, Czech Republic

References

External links
 Official website

Jasienica
Bielsko County
Cieszyn Silesia